Peter McArdle (8 April 1914 – 1979) was an English footballer who played in the Football League for Barnsley, Carlisle United, Exeter City, Gateshead, Stockport County and Stoke City.

Career
McArdle was born in Durham and started playing football for local clubs Trimdon Grange Colliery and former league club Durham City. In 1933 he joined Stoke City as back up for England international winger Joe Johnson. Johnson was injured for six matches during the 1933–34 season and McArdle took his place and scored once against Newcastle United. When Johnson recovered from his injury he took back his place in the side and McArdle dropped back into the reserves. He made just one more appearance for Stoke which came in the 1934–35 season before leaving for regular football in November 1935 joining Exeter City. He soon moved back north to Carlisle United and went on to play for Barnsley, Stockport County, Gateshead and finally Crewe Alexandra.

Career statistics
Source:

A.  The "Other" column constitutes appearances and goals in the Football League Third Division North Cup and Football League Third Division South Cup.

References

1914 births
Sportspeople from Durham, England
Footballers from County Durham
1979 deaths
English footballers
Association football outside forwards
Trimdon Grange F.C. players
Durham City A.F.C. players
Stoke City F.C. players
Exeter City F.C. players
Carlisle United F.C. players
Barnsley F.C. players
Stockport County F.C. players
Gateshead F.C. players
Crewe Alexandra F.C. players
English Football League players